Chris Barrett may refer to:

Chris Barrett (filmmaker) (born 1982), American Internet entrepreneur, film director, spokesperson, and author
Chris Barrett (Australian footballer) (born 1973), Australian footballer
Chris Barrett (Gaelic footballer)